Choi Yuen is one of the 17 constituencies in the North District, Hong Kong.

The constituency returns one district councillor to the North District Council, with an election every four years. The seat has been currently held by Lam Tsz-King of the Democratic.

Choi Yuen constituency is loosely based on Choi Yuen Estate and Choi Po Court in Sheung Shui with estimated population of 17,222.

Councillors represented

1988 to 1994

1994 to present

Election results

2010s

2000s

1990s

1980s

References

Sheung Shui
Constituencies of Hong Kong
Constituencies of North District Council
1988 establishments in Hong Kong
Constituencies established in 1988